Neuroevolution, or neuro-evolution, is a form of  artificial intelligence that uses evolutionary algorithms to generate artificial neural networks (ANN), parameters, and rules. It is most commonly applied in artificial life, general game playing and evolutionary robotics. The main benefit is that neuroevolution can be applied more widely than supervised learning algorithms, which require a syllabus of correct input-output pairs. In contrast, neuroevolution requires only a measure of a network's performance at a task. For example, the outcome of a game (i.e. whether one player won or lost) can be easily measured without providing labeled examples of desired strategies. Neuroevolution is commonly used as part of the reinforcement learning paradigm, and it can be contrasted with conventional deep learning techniques that use gradient descent on a neural network with a fixed topology.

Features

Many neuroevolution algorithms have been defined. One common distinction is between algorithms that evolve only the strength of the connection weights for a fixed network topology (sometimes called conventional neuroevolution), as opposed to those that evolve both the topology of the network and its weights (called TWEANNs, for Topology and Weight Evolving Artificial Neural Network algorithms).

A separate distinction can be made between methods that evolve the structure of ANNs in parallel to its parameters (those applying standard evolutionary algorithms) and those that develop them separately (through memetic algorithms).

Comparison with gradient descent
Most neural networks use gradient descent rather than neuroevolution. However, around 2017 researchers at Uber stated they had found that simple structural neuroevolution algorithms were competitive with sophisticated modern industry-standard gradient-descent deep learning algorithms, in part because neuroevolution was found to be less likely to get stuck in local minima. In Science,
journalist Matthew Hutson speculated that part of the reason neuroevolution is succeeding where it had failed before is due to the increased computational power available in the 2010s.

It can be shown that there is a correspondence between neuroevolution and gradient descent.

Direct and indirect encoding

Evolutionary algorithms operate on a population of genotypes (also referred to as genomes). In neuroevolution, a genotype is mapped to a neural network phenotype that is evaluated on some task to derive its fitness.

In direct encoding schemes the genotype directly maps to the phenotype. That is, every neuron and connection in the neural network is specified directly and explicitly in the genotype. In contrast, in indirect encoding schemes the genotype specifies indirectly how that network should be generated.

Indirect encodings are often used to achieve several aims:
 modularity and other regularities;
 compression of phenotype to a smaller genotype, providing a smaller search space;
 mapping the search space (genome) to the problem domain.

Taxonomy of embryogenic systems for indirect encoding

Traditionally indirect encodings that employ artificial embryogeny (also known as artificial development) have been categorised along the lines of a grammatical approach versus a cell chemistry approach. The former evolves sets of rules in the form of grammatical rewrite systems. The latter attempts to mimic how physical structures emerge in biology through gene expression. Indirect encoding systems often use aspects of both approaches.

Stanley and Miikkulainen propose a taxonomy for embryogenic systems that is intended to reflect their underlying properties. The taxonomy identifies five continuous dimensions, along which any embryogenic system can be placed:
 Cell (neuron) fate: the final characteristics and role of the cell in the mature phenotype. This dimension counts the number of methods used for determining the fate of a cell.
 Targeting: the method by which connections are directed from source cells to target cells. This ranges from specific targeting (source and target are explicitly identified) to relative targeting (e.g. based on locations of cells relative to each other).
 Heterochrony: the timing and ordering of events during embryogeny. Counts the number of mechanisms for changing the timing of events.
 Canalization: how tolerant the genome is to mutations (brittleness). Ranges from requiring precise genotypic instructions to a high tolerance of imprecise mutation.
 Complexification: the ability of the system (including evolutionary algorithm and genotype to phenotype mapping) to allow complexification of the genome (and hence phenotype) over time. Ranges from allowing only fixed-size genomes to allowing highly variable length genomes.

Examples

Examples of neuroevolution methods (those with direct encodings are necessarily non-embryogenic):

See also
 Automated machine learning (AutoML) 
 Evolutionary computation
 NeuroEvolution of Augmenting Topologies (NEAT)
 Noogenesis
 HyperNEAT (A Generative version of NEAT)
 Evolutionary Acquisition of Neural Topologies (EANT/EANT2)

References

External links
 
 </ref> (has downloadable papers on NEAT and applications)
  mature Open Source neuroevolution project implemented in C#/.Net.
 ANNEvolve is an Open Source AI Research Project (Downloadable source code in C and Python with a tutorial & miscellaneous writings and illustrations
 </ref> Web page on evolutionary learning with EANT/EANT2] (information and articles on EANT/EANT2 with applications to robot learning)
 NERD Toolkit. The Neurodynamics and Evolutionary Robotics Development Toolkit. A free, open source software collection for various experiments on neurocontrol and neuroevolution. Includes a scriptable simulator, several neuro-evolution algorithms (e.g. ICONE), cluster support, visual network design and analysis tools.
  Source code for the DXNN Neuroevolutionary system.
 

Evolutionary algorithms
Artificial neural networks